This article contains information about the literary events and publications of 1644.

Events
April 15 – The second Globe Theatre is demolished by the Puritan government to make room for housing.
November 23 – The publication in London of Areopagitica; A speech of Mr. John Milton for the Liberty of Unlicenc’d Printing, to the Parlament of England.
December (end) – English Puritan controversialist Hezekiah Woodward is questioned for two days about "scandalous" pamphlets.
With the London theatres closed by the Puritan regime, playwriting activity shifts to closet drama. The publication of an anonymous satire against Archbishop William Laud, titled Canterbury His Change of Diet, is one mark of the shift.
The publication of The Bloody Tenet of Persecution marks the start of a major controversy between Roger Williams and John Cotton on religious tolerance in a Calvinist context. The controversy plays out through a series of works issued by both men in the coming years, through to Williams' The Bloody Tenet Yet More Bloody (1652).

New books

Prose
John Milton
Areopagitica (tract against censorship)
Of Education
Roger Williams – The Bloody Tenet of Persecution
Francisco de Quevedo
Vida de Marco Bruto
Vida de San Pablo Apóstol
Juan Eusebio Nieremberg – Vida del santo padre y gran siervo de Dios el beato Francisco de Borja
René Descartes – Principia Philosophiae
Marin Mersenne – Cogitata physico-mathematica
Evangelista Torricelli – Opera geometrica
Giulio Strozzi (editor) – Le glorie della signora Anna Renzi romana (published in Venice; a tribute to Anna Renzi, the "first diva")

Drama
Lope de Vega – Fiestas del Santísimo Sacramento
Pierre Corneille – Le Menteur

Births
August 6 – Louise de la Vallière, French royal mistress, subject of a Dumas novel (died 1710)
October 2 – François-Timoléon de Choisy, French memoirist (died 1724)
Unknown dates
Matsuo Bashō (松尾 芭蕉), Japanese poet (died 1694)
Elinor James, English pamphleteer (died 1719)

Deaths
January 30 – William Chillingworth, English religious controversialist (born 1602)
March 5 – Ferrante Pallavicino, Italian satirist (born 1615)
March 8 – Xu Xiake (徐霞客), Chinese travel writer and geographer (born 1587)
September 7 – Cardinal Guido Bentivoglio, Italian historian (born 1579)
September 8 – Francis Quarles, English poet (born 1592)
November 10 – Luís Vélez de Guevara, Spanish dramatist and novelist (born 1579)
November 21 – Raphael Sobiehrd-Mnishovsky, Czech lawyer and writer (born 1580)

References

 
Years of the 17th century in literature